Mr. Moto is a fictional Japanese secret agent in a series of novels by John P. Marquand.

Mr. Moto may also refer to:

 A song by 1960s surf band The Bel-Airs
 A ring name of professional wrestler Tor Kamata
 A Yakuza boss character played by George Takei in "Drift Problem", a season 3 episode of the television series Archer